The 1990/91 FIS Nordic Combined World Cup was the eight World Cup season, a combination of ski jumping and cross-country skiing organized by International Ski Federation. It started on 15 Dec 1990 in Trondheim, Norway and ended on 23 March 1991 in St. Moritz, Switzerland.

Calendar

Men

Standings

Overall 

Standings after 8 events.

Nations Cup 

Standings after 8 events.

References

External links
FIS Nordic Combined World Cup 1990/91 

1990 in Nordic combined
1991 in Nordic combined
FIS Nordic Combined World Cup